The 1960 United States presidential election in Vermont  took place on November 8, 1960, as part of the 1960 United States presidential election which was held throughout all 50 states. Voters chose three representatives, or electors to the Electoral College, who voted for president and vice president.

Vermont was won by the Republican nominee, incumbent Vice President Richard Nixon of California, and his running mate  Ambassador Henry Cabot Lodge, Jr. of Massachusetts, defeating Democratic Senator John F. Kennedy of Massachusetts and his running mate Senate Majority Leader Lyndon B. Johnson of Texas.

Nixon took 58.65% of the vote to Kennedy’s 41.35%, a margin of 17.30%.

Vermont historically was a bastion of liberal Northeastern Republicanism, and by 1960 the Green Mountain State had gone Republican in every presidential election since the founding of the Republican Party. From 1856 to 1956, Vermont had had the longest streak of voting Republican of any state, having never voted Democratic before, and this tradition continued in 1960. This election would prove to be the conclusion of a 104-year winning streak, as Vermont would flip to the Democrats for the first time four years later in 1964.

As Kennedy won a razor-thin victory over Nixon nationally, Vermont weighed in as about seventeen percent more Republican than the national average, and his 58.65% of the popular vote made the Green Mountain State the fourth most Republican state in the nation in the 1960 election after Nebraska, Kansas and Oklahoma.

Kennedy, an Irish Catholic Democrat from neighboring Massachusetts, did however improve dramatically on the performance of Democrat Adlai Stevenson in Vermont in 1952 and 1956. In both of those years Stevenson had taken less than 30% of the vote against Republican Dwight Eisenhower, who had received more than 70% of the vote in Vermont and had swept every county in the state.

Nixon won 11 of the 14 counties in Vermont, losing 3 counties in the northwestern part of the state. The three northwestern counties of Vermont (Chittenden, Franklin and Grand Isle) had long been Democratic enclaves in an otherwise Republican state through the 1930s and 1940s, but had gone Republican in the 1950s for Eisenhower. Only the second Roman Catholic to be nominated for president by a major party, Kennedy's appeal to Catholics and ethnic working class voters brought northwestern Vermont back into the Democratic column in 1960. Kennedy won Chittenden County, the most populous county, home to the state's largest city, Burlington. Chittenden County had been the only county in Vermont to flip to the Democrats for the first Roman Catholic nominee Al Smith in 1928. Kennedy also won Franklin and Grand Isle Counties, which had joined Chittenden in voting Democratic for Franklin Roosevelt in 1932, even as the rest of the state remained reliably Republican. Thus the split between the northwest and the rest of the state was a familiar result typical of New Deal coalition era elections in Vermont.

Richard Nixon would later win the Green Mountain State again against Hubert Humphrey in 1968 and then again against George McGovern in 1972.

Results

Results by county

See also
 United States presidential elections in Vermont

References

Vermont
1960
1960 Vermont elections